The 2021 European Aesthetic Group Gymnastics Championships, the 4th edition, was held in Moscow, Russia, from May 14 to 16, 2021 at the Irina Viner-Usmanova Gymnastics Palace. Due to the global pandemic, many countries canceled their participation, so there was less competition.

Participating nations

Schedule

May 12 Saturday
 15:00 Opening Ceremony
 15:30 Junior Preliminaries
 17:30 Senior Preliminaries 

May 13 Sunday
 12:00 Junior Finals
 13:30 Senior Finals
 15:30 Awarding and Closing Ceremony

Medal winners

Results

Senior

The top 12 teams (2 per country) and the host country in Preliminaries qualify to the Finals.

Junior

The top 12 teams (2 per country) and the host country in Preliminaries qualify to the Finals.

Medal table

References

External links
http://rgform.eu/event.php?id_prop=1976
https://vfeg.ru/v4/ru/page.php?n=40

2021 in gymnastics
2021 in Russian sport
International sports competitions hosted by Russia
Sports competitions in Moscow
May 2021 sports events in Russia